Café com cheirinho ("coffee with a scent" in English) or bica com cheirinho is a Portuguese coffee with added alcohol (wine, aguardente, bagaço or medronho). Occasionally, the spirit can be served on the side. This combination is especially favored during colder seasons, and it is best enjoyed as a digestif.
It is also called a "Café com Música" (Coffee with music) in Madeira and Azores.

See also 
 Bica
 Galão

References

Alcoholic coffee drinks
Portuguese drinks